Oudesluis can refer to:

 Oudesluis, Hoeksche Waard, a hamlet  in the Dutch province of South Holland, part of the municipality of Hoeksche Waard
 Oudesluis, Schagen, a village in the Dutch province of North Holland, part of the municipality of Schagen